Chrys Ingraham is Professor of Sociology at Purchase College of the State University of New York.

Biography
Ingraham (b.1947) is a native of New York State, graduated from Syracuse University's Maxwell School with a Masters in Public Administration (1984), Graduate Certification in Women's Studies and a Ph.D. in Sociology (1992). Her dissertation research addressed how the Comstock Law (1872) allowed for the censorship and suppression of feminist thought in 19th century U.S. She has taught at a variety of colleges and universities, including Syracuse University, Ithaca College, Skidmore College, Smith College, Russell Sage College, SUNY Albany, and is currently Professor and Chair of Sociology at the State University of New York at Purchase. She currently lives in Syracuse, NY.

Career
Ingraham served as visiting professor at Ithaca College prior to receiving tenure and promotion to full professor at Russell Sage College where she directed the Helen M. Upton Center for Women's Studies and co-founded (with Tonia Blackwell) the Allies Center for the Study of Difference and Conflict. She later co-founded (with Dr. Eileen Brownell) their Management and Social Responsibility program. In 2007, she moved to SUNY Purchase to rebuild the Sociology program and later assisted in the creation of a Latin American Studies major. Ingraham currently serves as Professor of Sociology at Purchase College.

Ingraham was a guest speaker for the film Wedding Advice by Karen Sosnoski and Fred Zeytoojian, 2002.

Publications

Books (written, edited, or co-edited)
1997 Materialist Feminism: A Reader in Class, Difference, and Women's Live's,ed. by Chrys Ingraham and Rosemary Hennessy, Routledge, 1997. According to WorldCat, the book is held in 347 libraries.
1999 White Weddings: Romancing Heterosexuality in Popular Culture, 1st edition, Routledge, 1999 
2008 White Weddings: Romancing Heterosexuality in Popular Culture, 2nd edition, Routledge, 2008. 
2024 White Weddings: Romancing Heterosexuality in Popular Culture, 3rd edition, Routledge, 2016.  According to WorldCat, the editions of this book are held in 820 libraries.
2005 Thinking Straight: The Power, the Promise, and the Paradox of Heterosexuality, ed.by Chrys Ingraham.  Routledge,  2005. .  According to WorldCat, the book is held in 1116 libraries.

Book chapters
"Heterosexuality: It's Just Not Natural!," in Handbook of Lesbian and Gay Studies, edited by Diane Richardson and Steven Seidman, London: Sage. 2002 According to WorldCat, the book is held in 613 libraries.
"Thinking Straight, Acting Bent: Heteronormativity and Homosexuality," in Handbook of Gender and Women's Studies, edited by Kathy Davis, Mary Evans, and Judith Lorber,  London: Sage. 2006.
"Straightening Up: The Marriage of Conformity and Resistance in Wedding Art," in Wedded Bliss: The Marriage of Art and Ceremony, edited by Paula Bradstreet Richter, Peabody Essex Museum: 2008.

Academic journal articles
"The Heterosexual Imaginary: Feminist Sociology and Theories of Gender", Sociological Theory, Vol. 12, No. 2 (Jul., 1994), pp. 203–219
"Systemic Pedagogy: Activating Sociological Thinking Inside and Outside the Classroom", International Journal of Sociology and Social Policy, 1996
"Situational Shifts in Sex Role Orientation: Correlates of Work Satisfaction and Burnout Among Women in Special Education", Sex Roles, Vol. 25. Nos. 7/8 1991

Encyclopedia entries
 "Weddings,"in Routledge International Encyclopedia of Women, edited by Cherie Kramarae and Dale Spender, London: Sage, 2000
 "Heterosexual Imaginary," with Casey Saunders, in The Wiley-Blackwell Encyclopedia of Gender and Sexuality Studies, edited by Nancy Naples. Boston: Wiley-Blackwell, 2015

References

External links
 Google Scholar. Citations

Living people
Syracuse University alumni
20th-century American non-fiction writers
20th-century American women writers
21st-century American non-fiction writers
21st-century American women writers
American sociologists
American women sociologists
State University of New York at Purchase faculty
Ithaca College faculty
Russell Sage College faculty
American women non-fiction writers
1947 births